CSFB may refer to:

 Credit Suisse First Boston, the current (2022-present) and former (1996-2006) investment bank of Credit Suisse.
 College Students for Bernie, a former organization dedicated to increase young voter participation, during Bernie Sanders 2016 presidential campaign.
 Circuit Switch Fall Back (or CS fallback), a feature in LTE telecommunications.